Stenocodia is a monotypic moth genus of the family Noctuidae. Its only species, Stenocodia purpurascens, is found in French Guiana. Both the genus and species were first described by George Hampson in 1910.

References

Acontiinae
Monotypic moth genera